Milivoj Karakašević (30 July 1948 – 26 March 2022) was a Serbian international table tennis player who competed for Yugoslavia in the 1970s and 1980s.

Table tennis career
With the Yugoslav men's team, he won gold at the 1976 European Championships. In addition he won two silver medals and three bronze medals; in 1970 and 1972, he won silver in the team event and in 1974 and 1982, he won bronze, while he also won bronze in doubles in 1978 with Zoran Kosanović.

In the World Table Tennis Championships he won a bronze medal in 1971 and a silver medal in 1975 in the team event for Yugoslavia.

Personal life
His son is the Serbian table tennis champion Aleksandar Karakašević.

See also
 List of table tennis players
 List of World Table Tennis Championships medalists

References

External links
 Table Tennis guide profile of Karakašević

1948 births
2022 deaths
Yugoslav table tennis players
People from Zemun
Sportspeople from Belgrade
Serbian male table tennis players